The 1911–12 FA Cup was the 41st season of the world's oldest association football competition, the Football Association Challenge Cup (more usually known as the FA Cup). Barnsley won the competition for the first time, beating West Bromwich Albion 1–0 after extra time in the replay of the final at Bramall Lane in Sheffield, through a goal from Harry Tufnell. The first match, held at Crystal Palace, London, was a 0–0 draw.

Matches were scheduled to be played at the stadium of the team named first on the date specified for each round, which was always a Saturday. If scores were level after 90 minutes had been played, a replay would take place at the stadium of the second-named team later the same week. If the replayed match was drawn further replays would be held at neutral venues until a winner was determined. If scores were level after 90 minutes had been played in a replay, a 30-minute period of extra time would be played.

Calendar
The format of the FA Cup for the season had two preliminary rounds, five qualifying rounds, four proper rounds, and the semi finals and final.

First round proper
37 of the 40 clubs from the First and Second divisions joined the 12 clubs who came through the qualifying rounds. Three sides, Stockport County, Grimsby Town and Gainsborough Trinity were entered instead at the Fourth Qualifying Round. Grimsby Town lost to Lincoln City in that round, while the other two and ten other non-league clubs won through to the First Round Proper.

Fifteen non-league sides were given byes to the First Round to bring the total number of teams up to 64. These were:

32 matches were scheduled to be played on Saturday, 13 January 1912. Eight matches were drawn and went to replays in the following midweek fixture. One of these matches went to a second replay the following week.

Second round proper
The sixteen second round matches were played on Saturday, 3 February 1912. Five matches were drawn, with the replays taking place in the following midweek fixture.

Third round proper
The eight third-round matches were scheduled for Saturday, 24 February 1912. There were two replays, played in the following midweek fixture.

Fourth round proper
The four quarter final matches were scheduled for Saturday, 9 March 1912. There were two replays, played in the following midweek fixture. One of these went to a second replay the following week, and this then went to a third replay three days after that.

Semi-finals

The semi-final matches were played on Saturday, 30 March 1912. Both matches went to replays, which West Bromwich Albion and Barnsley won, going on to meet each other in the final.

Replay

Replay

Final

The Final was contested by Barnsley and West Bromwich Albion. It took two matches to determine a winner. The first took place at Crystal Palace on 20 April 1912 and the second on 24 April at Bramall Lane. Barnsley won the replay 1–0 after extra time, through a single goal from Harry Tufnell.

Match details

Replay

See also
FA Cup Final Results 1872-

References
General
Official site; fixtures and results service at TheFA.com
1911-12 FA Cup at rsssf.com
1911-12 FA Cup at soccerbase.com

Specific

1911-12
FA
Cup